Brand New is the seventh studio album of South Korean boy band Shinhwa. It was released on 27 August 2004 by Good Entertainment. It is their first album since leaving SM Entertainment and signing with Good Entertainment. The four lead tracks are "Brand New", "Angel", "Crazy" and "Oh".

Music and reception
The members of Shinhwa began taking charge as lyricist in the release of the album.  Eric wrote some rap lyrics for some of the songs while Minwoo took charge and began writing full lyrics.  Some songs that he wrote are: "All of My", "Oh" and "U".  He later went on to write the song "Superstar" for the group Jewelry, which became a hit.

Debuted at #3, "Brand New" made its way to #2 and then dropped to #11.  However, it made a large jump from #11 to #1, with a large jump in sales from 168,654 copies to 320,337 copies.

The lead track "Brand New",  was composed by Cho Young-soo, won the Triple Crown, i.e. first place for three consecutive weeks, on M.net's live music programme M! Countdown, from 26 August to 9 September 2004.

Tracks
Information is adapted from the liner notes of Brand New:

Chart performance

Release history

Personnel
Information is adapted from the liner notes of Brand New:
 Park Geun-tae - producer
 Shinhwa - producer
 Kim Young-seong - recording engineer, mixing engineer
 Yoon Won-kwon - recording engineer
 Song Kyeong-jo - recording engineer
 Kang Hae-gu - recording engineer
 Jeong Doo-seok - recording engineer
 Ha Jeong-soo - recording engineer
 Ko Seung-wook - mixing engineer
 Park Hyeok - mixing engineer
 Jo Kyu-beom - mixing engineer
 Sam Lee - guitar
 Tommy Lee - guitar
 Hong Joon-ho - guitar
 Ko Tae-young - guitar
 Lee Tae-yoon - bass
 Im Seung-beom - keyboard
 The String - strings

References

2004 albums
Shinhwa albums
Korean-language albums
Good Entertainment albums